Southern California Street Music is Voodoo Glow Skulls' eighth album, released on September 18, 2007, on Victory Records (VR 348).

Unlike most of the band's other albums, it doesn't contain any cover songs. All of its songs were written by Voodoo Glow Skulls.

Track listing

References 

2007 albums
Victory Records albums
Voodoo Glow Skulls albums